Mesorhizobium muleiense is a bacterium from the genus Mesorhizobium which was isolated from Cicer arietinum in Xinjiang in China.

References

External links
Type strain of Mesorhizobium muleiense at BacDive -  the Bacterial Diversity Metadatabase

Phyllobacteriaceae
Bacteria described in 2012